Serpaize is a commune in the Isère department in southeastern France.

Population

See also
Communes of the Isère department

References

Communes of Isère
Isère communes articles needing translation from French Wikipedia